Newport Corner is a community in the Canadian province of Nova Scotia, located in the Municipal District of West Hants.

See also
Naval Radio Station Newport Corner

References
 Newport Corner on Destination Nova Scotia

Communities in Hants County, Nova Scotia
General Service Areas in Nova Scotia